XHTY-FM may refer to:

 XHTY-FM (Baja California), a radio station in Tijuana, Baja California, Mexico
 XHTY-FM (Colima), a radio station in Tecomán, Colima, Mexico